Toltec is the ninth solo album by Yes lead singer Jon Anderson, released in 1996.

Background
A promo album called The Power of Silence was released in 1992 by Geffen (only on musicassette). A full release never appeared, but Toltec is essentially the same music, with added narration.

The 1996 Toltec release is made up of 13 cuts divided into three parts. It tells the tale of the Toltec, a Native American concept of a group of people who have been all over the Earth, existing within different cultures throughout the centuries. They are described in the album liner as "Creators of the circles of power, color, perfume, and music healing domes." Musically, it is progressive rock with elements of new age, world music, electronic, and jazz. Anderson provided the vocals, wrote, arranged, and produced the work.

Track listing
Part I
1. "The Book Opens" (4:59)
2. "Quick Words (Talk- Talk)" (Anderson, Perez) (2:54)
3. "Shall We Play the Game" (3:45)
4. "Semati Siyonpme" (3:16)
Part II 
5. "Good Day Morning" (2:02)
6. "Leap into the Inconceivable" (3:53)
7. "Song of Home" (1:11)
8. "Building Bridges" (Anderson, del Signore) (5:55)
9. "Sound and Color" (4:01)
10. "Longwalker Speaks" (2:48)
Part III
11.  "Maazo Maazo" (1:23) 
12. "Enter Ye the Mystery School" (7:54)
13. "Ave Verum" (Mozart) (3:08)

All music written by Jon Anderson; except where stated above

Personnel 
Jon Anderson: all vocals

With
Keith Heffner - keyboards, orchestration
Luis Perez - percussion
Eduardo del Signore - bass
Freddy Ramos - guitars
Otmaro Ruiz - solo keyboards
Charles Bisharat - violin
Patricia Hood - harp
Paul Haney - saxophone
Salo Loyo - keyboards on 13
Deborah Anderson - harmonic vocals
Nina Swan - vocals
Maria E Del Ray - vocals
Daniel Navarro - vocals
David Eric Lowen - vocals

References

1996 albums
Jon Anderson albums